"Carousel" is a song by American rock band Blink-182. It is the opening track on the group's debut studio album, Cheshire Cat (1995). The song originated during the first jam session between band members guitarist Tom DeLonge and bassist Mark Hoppus in August of 1992.

The song has been a staple of the band's live performances since their founding. "Carousel" was included on their demo album Buddha, and was later included as the only non-single on the band's Greatest Hits.

Background
The origins of "Carousel" lie in the first jam session between guitarist Tom DeLonge and bassist Mark Hoppus in August 1992. The two were introduced by Hoppus' sister, Anne, and met in DeLonge's garage. For hours, the two practiced the songs DeLonge had written (collected in a red notebook) and Hoppus' compositions. By the end of the night, the two had formed the basis of "Carousel"; "Instantly, I felt like we had the same musical style; he just had it on a different instrument than me," DeLonge said. The song was first recorded for the band's third demo, which came to be known as Buddha, released in January 1994 and distributed via cassette. The song was recorded once more, in a slightly different arrangement, on the band's debut, Cheshire Cat, issued in February 1995.

The song remains a staple of the band's live performances, and has become a crowd favorite. "I felt massively enamored with how the kids reacted to [performing the song]," DeLonge told Rolling Stone in 2013, following the band's show at Brooklyn's Music Hall of Williamsburg. "I got soaked into their enthusiasm last night, trying to figure out why that song is still around." When asked if he still felt a connection to the song, two decades after its recording, he responded: "It's a love-hate thing. To me, it was a philosophical kind of question: How did we have one of our first songs, if not our first? How do you feel not a part of it? I always feel I wish I wrote better lyrics, yet at the time it was so different for pop-punk. It was, like, so fast."

Music
The song is composed in the key of D major and is set in common time. DeLonge's vocal range spans from A3 to G4. The song "begins with a mid-paced riff and some nice undistorted jangling guitars before smashing into a satisfyingly fast-assed punk song in the vein of NOFX with some very adept dynamic breakdowns."

Lyrics

The song is about DeLonge feeling lonely and looking back at his school days nostalgically.

Reception
Consequence of Sound, in a 2015 top 10 of the band's best songs, ranked it as number five, commenting, "The song may very well have perfected the '90s pop-punk formula: unlike the audience, four-chord sugar and the caffeinated heartbeat of Scott Raynor's drum fills never age." In 2016, Stereogum ranked the song number six on their list of the 10 greatest Blink-182 songs, and in 2022, Kerrang ranked the song number four on their list of the 20 greatest Blink-182 songs.

References

Notes

External links

Blink-182 songs
1994 songs
1995 songs
Songs written by Mark Hoppus
Songs written by Tom DeLonge
Songs about school
Songs about loneliness